Bokol is a village in the Kemangkon District, Central Java, Indonesia.

References

Bokol